Johnstownbridge ( or Droichead Baile Sheáin) is a commuter town located in north County Kildare, Ireland. It lies in the parish of Cadamstown, in the district of Balyna, and barony of Carbury. It is located on the R402 road between Enfield and Edenderry just off the M4 motorway. As of the 2016 census, Johnstownbridge had a population of 683 people, up from 211 in the 2002 census.

History
The bridge was the scene of a battle in the 1798 rebellion between Michael Aylmer's rebel forces and British colonial forces. Johnstownbridge had a patent granted in the 17th century for holding a weekly market on Monday, but Lewis's Topography noted in 1837 that "this privilege has not been enjoyed for many years: fairs are held on March 31st, May 29th, Oct. 13th, and Dec. 21st." Lewis also noted "a curious old cross, the only relic to mark the site of an abbey that formerly existed here.". A constabulary police station was based here in the first half of the 19th century. One of Daniel O'Connell's colleagues in Irish independence movement Richard More O'Ferrall (1797–1880), MP for Kildare 1839-57 and 1859–65, lived in Balyna house.

Amenities
The town is served by Saint Patrick's National School. The town's Gothic-style Catholic church dates to c.1830, and is also dedicated to Saint Patrick.

Johnstownbridge GAA, the local Gaelic Athletic Association club, has won the Kildare football championship three times.

References

Towns and villages in County Kildare